Puertas is one of nine parishes (administrative divisions)  in Cabrales, a municipality within the province and autonomous community of Asturias, in northern Spain. 

Villages
 El Escobal 
 Pandiello 
 Puertas

References

Parishes in Cabrales